Goniobranchus pruna is a species of sea slug, a dorid nudibranch, a marine gastropod mollusc in the family Chromodorididae.

Distribution
It has been reported from Nosy Bé, Madagascar.

Description
The mantle of Goniobranchus pruna is mostly light grey, with dark plum or black spots and a broad white band at the margin overlain with large round orange spots at regular intervals. Individuals of  may develop a patch of cream with brown spots behind the rhinophores and just in front of the gill circlet. The rhinophores and gills are translucent with some orange pigment and small white spots.

References

Chromodorididae
Gastropods described in 1994